Changi is the area in eastern Singapore.

Changi may also refer to:

 Changi (musical instrument), traditional in Georgia
 Changi (TV series)
 Changi, Iran, a village in Tehran Province
 Changi Air Base
  Changi Airport in Singapore
 Changi Airport MRT station
 Changi Airport Skytrain
 Changi Business Park
 Changi Depot
 Changi Exhibition Centre
 Changi General Hospital
 Changi Murals, painted by Stanley Warren in Changi Prison 1942-1943
 Changi Naval Base
 Changi Prison
 Changi Sailing Club
 Changi Tree, a notably tall tree in Changi
 Changi University, the nickname of a program of education for detainees in the Changi Prisoner of War camp during World War II
 Changi Village

See also